Jakub Szymański (born 5 July 2002) is a Polish professional footballer who plays as a centre-back for Wisła Płock.

Career statistics

Club

References

External links

2002 births
Living people
People from Opoczno
Polish footballers
Association football defenders
Polonia Warsaw players
Górnik Zabrze players
Wisła Płock players
III liga players
Ekstraklasa players
Poland youth international footballers